This is a list of prominent Syrian Christians of Kerala.

Government of India
 P. J. Thomas, Parakunnel, an economist who served as first economic advisor of independent India (1942-1948), member of Indian delegation that signed the UN Charter (1945), Member of Parliament, Rajya Sabha (1957–1962) and founder-principal of St. Thomas College, Palai (1950–1952).
A. M. Thomas Union Minister , Chairman Khadi Commission )
 John Mathai, an economist who served as India's first Railway Minister (1947–1948), as Finance Minister (1949–1950), first Chairman of State Bank of India (1955), Vice Chancellor of University of Mumbai (1955-1957) and of University of Kerala (1957-1959).
 K. V. Thomas – Ministry of Consumer Affairs, Food and Public Distribution. (2009 – 2014).
 M. M. Jacob – Ministries of Parliamentary Affairs, Water Resources and Home Affairs at different periods (1987–93).
 A. K. Antony, politician who served as Defence Minister of India (2006-2014), Chief Minister of Kerala (1977–78, 1995–96, 2001-2004) and Member of Parliament, Rajya Sabha (1985–1995, 2005–present).
 P. J. Kurien – 18th Deputy Chairman of the Rajya Sabha (2012–2018)

Governors of states
 K.M. Chandy – Governor of Gujarat, Governor of Madhya Pradesh
 P.C. Alexander
 ninth Governor of Tamil Nadu, 1988–1990
 seventeenth Governor of Maharashtra, 1993–2002
 seventh Governor of Goa, 1996–1998
 P V Cherian – eighth Governor of Maharashtra, 1964–1969
 M. M. Jacob – ninth Governor of Meghalaya, 1995–2007
 A. J. John, Anaparambil – fourth Governor of Madras, 1956–1957
 Madathilparampil Mammen Thomas Governor of Nagaland, 1990-1992
 M. M. Jacob, ninth Governor of Meghalaya from 1995 to 2007

Council of Ministers, India
 John Mathai – Minister for Finance (1948–1950)
A.K. Antony – Minister of Defence (2006–2014) – Minister for Consumer Affairs, Food and Public Distribution (1993–1995)

Minister of State (Independent Charges)
 K. V. Thomas – Ministry of Consumer Affairs, Food and Public Distribution (2009–2014)
 Alphons Kannanthanam, BJP - Union Minister of State for Electronics and Information Technology, Culture, and Tourism (2016–2019)

Minister of State (MoS)
 M. M. Jacob – Ministries of Parliamentary Affairs, Water Resources and Home Affairs at different periods (1987–93)

State governments

Chief Ministers of Kerala
 A. K. Antony – Former Chief Minister of Kerala.
 Oommen Chandy – Former Chief Minister of Kerala.

Chief Ministers of Travancore-Cochin (1949-56)
 Anaparambil Joseph John – Former Chief Minister of Kerala.2nd Assembly(1952–53)(1951 election)

Ministers
 T. M. Varghese – Minister for Education, Travancore (1948), of Travancore-Cochin (1952)
Anoop Jacob –  Minister for Food and Civil Supplies (2011–2016)
Baby John – Minister for Revenue & Labour (1970–77)
E. John Jacob – Minister for Food and Civil Supplies (1977)
Jose Thettayil– Minister for Transport  (2006–11)
 Joseph Mundassery – Minister for Education & Co-operation, Kerala (1957–1959)
K. C. George – Minister for Food and Forest (1957–59)
K. C. Joseph – Minister for Information & Public Relations, Rural Development and Norka roots. (2011– 16)
K. M. George  – Minister for Transport & Health (1969–70)
 K.M. Mani – Minister for Finance (1975–1977; 1980–1986; 2011–2016);  Home Affairs (1977–1979); Irrigation (1987); Revenue (1991–1996; 2001–2006)
C. F. Thomas – Minister for Culture (2001–2004)
K. T. Jacob – Minister for Revenue (1969–72)
 M.A. Baby – Minister for Education (2006–2011)
 Mathew T. Thomas – Minister for Transport (2006–2009)
J. Mercykutty Amma  – Minister for Fisheries, Harbour Engineering and Traditional Industries. (2016 – 2021)
 Monce Joseph –  Minister for Public Works (2007–2009)
N.M. Joseph – Minister for Forests (1987 - 1991)
 P. J. Joseph – Minister for Public Works (1996-2001, 2006 and 2009-2010); Water Resources (2011-2016)
P. P. George – Minister for Labour and Employment
 Labour and Employment
P. T. Chacko – Minister for Home Affairs (1960 – 1964 )
Shibu Baby John – Minister for Labour and Employment (2011– 2016 )
T.M. Jacob – Minister for Education (1982 – 1987)
T. M. Thomas Isaac – Minister of Finance and Coir (2006 - 2011, 2016 – 2021)
T. V. Thomas – Minister for Labour, Employment and Transport (1957–59)
T. S. John – Minister for Food and Civil Supplies (1977 - 1978)
E. P. Poulose – Minister for Food and Agriculture (1960–1964)

Other states
 K. J. George – Minister of Home, Karnataka (2013–2016)

Political leaders
 C.P.Mathen – Member of Parliament (1952); Indian Ambassador to Sudan (1957–1960)
 Mathai Manjooran – member of Rajya Sabha (1952–1954)
 K. M. George – member, Kerala Legislative Assembly (1960–1964) founder Kerala Congress (1964)
 P. Chacko MLA – Member, Kerala Legislative Assembly (1960–1964)
 Dr. George Thomas – Kerala Legislative Assembly (1967–1970)
 M. T. Jacob – Mayor of Aluva (2010–incumbent)
 P.J. Kurien – Member and Deputy Speaker of Rajya Sabha from Kerala (2012–incumbent)
 Oommen Chandy – former chief minister Kerala (2446 days)
 Charles Dias – first Malayalee nominated as Anglo Indian MP
 Richard Hay – BJP Loksabha MP from Kerala, second Malayalee nominated as Anglo Indian MP
 Alphonse Kannanthanam – former Central Tourism, IT, Electronics Minister; BJP Rajyasabha MP from Kerala

Award winners

Padma Vibhushan
 John Matthai – Literature & Education (1959)
 Verghese Kurien – Dairy farming & food production (1999)
 George Sudarshan – Science & Engineering (2007)

Padma Bhushan
 Dr. Jacob Chandy – Neurosciences & surgery (1964)
 Kandathil Mammen Cherian – Literature & Education (1971)
 Pothan Joseph – Literature & Education (1973)
 George Sudarshan – Literature & Education (1976)
 Thomas Kailath – Science and Engineering (2009)
 T. K. Oommen – sociologist
 Thayil Jacob Sony George (T. J. S. George) – Literature & Education (2011)
 Jacob Cherian – Social Work (1999)
Philipose Chrysostyom Mar Thoma -Social & Religious Service (2018)

Padma Shri
 Perakath Verghese Benjamin – Medicine (1955)
 Kandathil Mammen Cherian – Literature & Education (1965)
 Dr. Mary Poonen Lukose – Obstetrics and gynaecology (1975)
 Manathoor Devasia Valsamma, M. D. Valsamma – Sports (1983)
 T. K. Alex – Science and Technology (2007)
 Jose Chacko Periappuram – Medicine (2011); first heart transplant Kerala

National Medal of Science
 Thomas Kailath (2012) – presented by President Barack Obama in 2014 for "transformative contributions to the fields of information and system science, for distinctive and sustained mentoring of young scholars, and for translation of scientific ideas into entrepreneurial ventures that have had a significant impact on industry"

Booker Prize
 Arundhati Roy – awarded the 1997 Booker Prize for her novel The God of Small Things

Fellow of the British Academy
Rajesh Chandy

The Medal of the Order of Australia
Sajeev Koshy

Civil Services

India
 Alexander Jacob – Retired IPS, former Kerala Director General of Police
 B. G. Verghese – former information adviser to Prime Minister Indira Gandhi
 P.J Thomas Parakunnel – first Chief Economic Advisor of India
 Anna Malhotra – first female member of the Indian Administrative Service
 Hormis Tharakan – former Chief of the Research and Analysis Wing
 Jacob Thomas – retired IPS, former Director General of Vigilance & Anti-Corruption Bureau (VACB), Government of Kerala
 Jacob Punnoose – Director General of Police of Kerala and as the State Police Chief
Merin Joseph – Youngest woman IPS
M.O. Mathai - Private Secretary to India's first Prime Minister Jawaharlal Nehru.
 P. J. Thomas – 14th Central Vigilance Commissioner of India
 Ranjan Mathai – 28th Foreign Secretary of India.
 V. J. Kurian – Additional Chief Secretary to the Government of Kerala, Managing Director of Cochin International Airport

Australia
Peter Varghese – Former Secretary of the Department of Foreign Affairs and Trade

Military leaders

Indian Army 
 Lieutenant General Philip Campose – Vice Chief of the Army Staff of the Indian Army
 Lieutenant General Bobby Cherian Mathews – General officer commanding of Konark Corps
 Havildar Thomas Philipose – medal winner in the Indo-Pakistani War of 1971

Indian Navy
 Admiral Ronald Lynsdale Pereira – 9th Chief of Naval Staff of the Indian Navy (1979–1982), former Flag Officer Commanding-in-Chief of the Eastern Fleet (FOCEF), Eastern Naval Command, former Flag Officer Commanding-in-Chief of the Southern Naval Command and former Flag Officer Commanding-in-Chief of the Western Naval Command
 Vice Admiral EC Kuruvila, Western Fleet Commander during India-Pakistan War (1971), Chairman & Managing Director, Mazagon Dock, Mumbai (1972-1976)

Law

Supreme Court Judges
K. K. Mathew (1971–1976)
 Kurian Joseph (2013–)
K. Thomas (1985–2006)
Cyriac Joseph (2008–2012)
K M Joseph (2018– till date)

High Court Judges
 Anna Chandy, first woman judge of an Indian High Court
Bechu Kurian Thomas, judge of Kerala High Court
J. B. Koshy, Chief Justice Patna high court
Mary Joseph, Kerala High Court judge 
P. Cherian, high court judge of Travancore
Antony Dominic, former Chief Justice of Kerala
Pius C. Kuriakose, Chief Justice of Sikkim High court
Shaji P. Chaly, Kerala High Court judge 
Sunil Thomas, Kerala High Court judge
T. C. Poonen, High court judge of Travancore and the first Malayali to study law in England.
Sathish Ninan, present Kerala High court judge

Lawyers
 Barrister George Joseph (1887 – 1938), a lawyer and Indian independence activist. Remembered for his role in Home Rule agitation and Vaikom Satyagraha, and for his editorship of Motilal Nehru's The Independent and Mahatma Gandhi's Young India.
Rose Varghese, former Vice Chancellor of National University of Advanced Legal Studies, Kochi.
Advocate V.J Mathai, a lawyer and Indian independence activist, Best known for being the first Indian to defeat a European in an election.

Academia

Scientists
 Tessy Thomas (1963–) – Indian scientist and Director General of Aeronautical Systems and the former Project Director for Agni-IV missile in Defence Research and Development Organisation. She is the first woman scientist to head a missile project in India. She is known as the 'Missile Woman' of India.
 George Varghese – Principal Researcher at Microsoft Research

Faculty
 Abraham Verghese – professor of medicine at Stanford University
 George Sudarsan – Padma Vibhushan Emeritus professor
 Thomas Kailath – Padma Bhushan; Professor of Engineering
 George Varghese – Professor of Computer Science
 K. Mani Chandy – Professor of Computer Science
 Mathai Varghese – Professor of Mathematics
 Prema Kurien – Professor of Sociology
 Priya Kurian - Professor of economics
 Pulickel Ajayan – Professor of Engineering
 Thomas Zacharia – computer scientist
Varghese Mathai – professor of mathematics at University of Adelaide
 Pius Malekandathil - Professor of History at Jawaharlal Nehru University, New Delhi

Heads of institutions
 Mathai Varghese – Director of the Institute for Geometry and its Applications (IGA), Adelaide
 Eluvathingal Devassy Jemmis – Director of Indian Institute of Science Education and Research, Thiruvananthapuram
K. T. Chandy – Founder and former director of Indian Institute of Management Calcutta, the first Indian Institute of Management

Medical sciences
 Mary Poonen Lukose – first female surgeon general of India
 Abraham Verghese – Professor of Medicine and Senior Associate Chair of Department of Internal Medicine at Stanford University School of Medicine
 Lucy Oommen – Indian gynaecologist, first medical director of Indian origin at the St Stephen's Hospital, Delhi
 Sunny Kurian – founder president of the UAE wing of the Indian Academy of Pediatrics
 Thomas Thomas – first Indian cardio-thoracic surgeon
Jacob Chandy – first neurosurgeon in India

Business and commerce 
 M. G. George Muthoot – Chairman of  Muthoot Group
 Thomas Kurian – Global President of Product Development at Oracle Corporation, CEO of Google Cloud
 Reji Abraham – Managing Director of ABAN Group of Companies
 C J George – founder and CEO of Geojit Financial Services
 T K Kurien – CEO of Wipro
 George Alexander Muthoot – Managing Director of Muthoot Finance & Muthoot Group
 Verghese Kurien – founder Chairman of Gujarat Co-operative Milk Marketing Federation Ltd.
Joy Allukas, Chairman of Joyalukkas Group
 K.M. Mammen Mappilai – founder of MRF Tyres and Manorama publications
 Kochouseph Chittilappilly – Managing Director of V Guard Industries Ltd
 Mathunny Mathews – former MD of Al-Sayer Group; former Chairman of Jabriya Indian School; co-founder of Indian Arts Circle, Kuwait
Sunny Varkey, Founder of GEMS Education
Thachil Mathoo Tharakan, Trader and Former Commerce Minister of  Travancore
T. K. Kurien – Managing Partner and Chief Investment Officer at Azim Premji
Sabu M Jacob – managing director of Kitex Garments Limited.

Social reformers

Independence activists
 Kuriakose Elias Chavara - scholar, educator and community leader of Chaldean Syrians 
 Accamma Cherian – Jhansi Rani of Travancore
 T. M. Varghese – Minister of Travancore-Cochin
 George Joseph – lawyer, trade unionist and nationalist activist
 Titus Theverthundiyil – one among who led the Dandi March.
 A. J. John, Anaparambil – one of the founding leaders of Travancore State Congress. Former Chief Minister of Kerala.2nd Assembly(1952–53)(1951 election)
 Rosamma Punnoose – independence activist, politician and lawyer and the first person to be sworn in as a member of the Kerala Legislative Assembly.

Religion

Saints

Malankara Syrian Church (Puthenkoor)
Gheevarghese Gregorios of Parumala, Malankara Church

Malankara Orthodox Syrian Church
Geevarghese Dionysius of Vattasseril, Malankara Metropolitan Malankara Orthodox Syrian Church

Jacobite Syrian Christian Church
Paulose Athanasius - Methropolitian of Jacobite Syrian Church (entombed in Aluva Thrikkunnathu Seminary )
Koorilos Paulose - Malankara Metropolitan (Entombed in Panampady Church)

Malabar Independent Syrian Church
Kattumangattu Abraham Koorilos I Metropolitan Of Thozhiyur Malabar Independent Syrian Church (Entombed in St. George Cathedral Church Thozhiyur)
Kattumangattu Geevargheese Koorilose II Metropolitan Of Thozhiyur Malabar Independent Syrian Church (Entombed in Vettikal Monstray)

Pazhayakoor

Syro Malabar Church (Catholic) 
Saint Alphonsa, born Anna Muttathupadathu
Kuriakose Elias Chavara
Euphrasia Eluvathingal
Mariam Thresia

Chaldean Syrian Church
Abimalek Timotheus

Heads of Churches

Malankara Syrian Churches (puthenkoor nasranis)

Malankara Orthodox Syrian Church
Baselios Marthoma Mathews III, Supreme Head, Catholicos of the East and the Malankara Metropolitan

Malankara Mar Thoma Syrian Church

Theodosius Mar Thoma, Supreme Head of Malankara Marthoma Syrian Church and Metropolitan of the Throne of Malankara

Jacobite Syrian Christian Church

Baselios Thomas I, Catholicos of India

Malabar Independent Syrian Church
Cyril Baselios I Supreme Head and primate Metropolitan Of Thozhiyur  Malabar Independent Syrian Church

Syro-Malankara Church
Baselios Cleemis
Cyril Baselios
Benedict Gregorios
Geevarghese Ivanios

Heads of the Chaldean Syrian  Churches (Pazhayakoor Nasranis)

Syro-Malabar Church
 George Alencherry
Varkey Vithayathil
Antony Padiyara

Chaldean Syrian Church
 Aprem Mooken

Others

George Menachery (born 1938), historian, editor of the St. Thomas Christian Encyclopedia of India
Acharya K K Chandy, Founder Member- Christavashram, Kottayam.
Joshua Ignathios, Bishop of the Eparchy of Mavelikara.
Geevarghese Ivanios,  Servant of God, OIC (1882–1953).
K. C. John former President of India Pentecostal Church of God.
Placid Podipara- Syriacist, Syro-Malabar Theologian and Church historian
V.C. Samuel  Syrian Orthodox Theologian and Church Historian
Sebastian Kappen, liberation theologian
Varghese Payyappilly Palakkappilly, Venerable and the founder of the Congregation of the Sisters of the Destitute.
Curien Kaniamparambil- Syriacist, Syriac Orthodox theologian and church historian
Joseph Powathil, Archbishop of Syro-Malabar Catholic Archdiocese of Changanassery
Philipose Chrysostom Mar Thoma, Marthoma Valiya Metropolitan

Humanities

Grammarian & Linguist
 Rev. George Mathan – first Malayali to produce an authoritative Grammar Book for Malayalam (1863), in Malayalam.
 Thomas Koonammakkal -Syriacist and expert in Garshuni Malayalam.

Literature and writing

Poets
Curien Kaniamparambil- Syriacist and poet
 P. C. Devassia, author, literary translator poet, and composer of Christian poetry in Sanskrit
Mathew Ulakamthara, poet and author of epic Christu Gadha.
K. V. Simon, poet

Writers
 Arundhati Roy – writer, awarded the Booker Prize in 1997 for The God of Small Things, which is set in Kerala
 Arch Deacon Koshy (1825–1899) – author of Pulleli Kunju (1882); the first novellike original work on a local theme, in Malayalam, and a number of other books
 George Menachery – historian, editor of The St. Thomas Christian Encyclopaedia of India, editor of The Indian Church History Classics (The Nazranies)
 Mridula Koshy
 M. P. Paul – literary critic
 P. C. Devassia (1906–2006) – Sanskrit scholar and poet who won the Sahitya Akademi Award (1980) for Sanskrit for his poem "Kristubhagavatam"
 Paul Zacharia – writer
 Sarah Joseph – writer, Novelist, Sahitya Academy winner

Fictional Writers
George Onakkoor
Jose Panachippuram (1951–)
Joy J. Kaimaparamban (1939–
Kakkanadan (1935–)
Lajo Jose
Muttathu Varkey (1917–1989)
P. F. Mathews (1960-)
Ponkunnam Varkey (1911–2004)
Sarah Joseph (1946–)
T. V. Varkey (1938–)
T.V. Kochubava (1955-1999)

Travelogue
 Paremmakkal Thoma Kathanar - Author of the first travelogue in an Indian language (1778)

Journalists
 Sunnykutty Abraham – COO and Chief News Editor of Jaihind TV; political analyst
 Sebastian Paul – Media critic
 Kandathil Varghese Mappillai (1890 - 1904) – Founder and first editor in chief of Malayala Manorama
 Kandathil Cherian Mappilai – second chief editor of Malayala Manorama
 K. M. Cherian (1954 - 1973) – third editor in chief of Malayala Manorama
 K. M. Mathew (1973 - 2010) – fourth editor in chief of Malayala Manorama
 Mammen Mathew (2010–present) – present chief editor of Manorama
 Reena Ninan – American television journalist working for CBS News, New York City
 Santhosh George Kulangara -  entrepreneur and explorer

Film and media

Models
 Eden Kuriakose
 Nafisa Joseph
 Nina Manuel
 Rohini Mariam Idicula
 Surelee Joseph
Serin George

Actresses
Aima Rosmy Sebastian
 Ann Augustine
Amala Paul
Anna Ben
Anna Reshma Rajan
Annie
Anju Kurian
Anu Emmanuel
Anu Joseph
Archana Jose Kavi
 Asin Thottumkal
Beena Anthony
Blessy Kurian
 Catherine Tresa
Dhanya Mary Varghese
Esther Anil
Hannah Reji Koshy
Oviya (Helon Nelson)
Honey Rose
Gopika
Grace Anthony
Jomol
Karthika Mathew
Leona Lishoy
Lena
 Lijomol Jose
 Liza Koshy
Mareena Michael Kurisingal
Malaika Arora
Miya George
 Meera Jasmine – National Film Award for Best Actress (2004)
Madona
Mithra Kurian
 Muktha George
Malaika Arora
 Nayantara
Nivetha Thomas
Pearly Maaney
Philomena
Prayaga Martin
 Priyanka Chopra
Rajini Chandy
Reba Monica John
 Reenu Mathews
Samantha Akkineni
Rosin Jolly
Rekha (Sumathi Josephine)
Sandra Thoma
Sija Rose
Shalini
Shalu Kurian
Sheela
Sheelu Abraham
Vinitha Koshy

Actors
Anish Kuruvilla
 Aju Varghese
 Alummoodan
Augastine
Babu Antony
Basil Joseph
Boban Alummoodan
Innocent
Jacob Gregory
John Abraham
Joju George
 Jose
 Jude Anthany Joseph
 Kunchako Boban

 Nivin Pauly
Shine Tom Chacko
 Siju Wilson
 Tovino Thomas
Dino Morea
Roshan Mathew
Lalu Alex

Music
 Anna Katharina Valayil – playback singer
 Alex Paul – music director
 Benny Dayal – playback singer
 Berny-Ignatius – music director duo
 Job Kurian – playback singer
 Jose Prakash – playback singer
 Nikhil Mathew – playback singer
 Ouseppachan – music director
 Sabrina Setlur – German rapper and singer
 Stephen Devassy – pianist, music composer
 Rimi Tomy – playback singer
 Ranjini Jose – playback singer

Sports

Athletics
 Anilda Thomas
 Anju Bobby George
 Bobby Aloysius
 Ivan Jacob
 Jincy Phillip
 Jisna Mathew
 Joseph Abraham
 K.M. Beenamol
 Mercy Kuttan
 Molly Chacko* Rosa Kutty
 Shiny Abraham
 Sini Jose
 Sinimol Paulose
 T. C. Yohannan
 Tintu Lukka

Badminton
 George Thomas
 Sanave Thomas
 V. Diju
Shruti Kurien

Basketball
 Geethu Anna Jose (C)
 P. S. Jeena (C)

Cricket
 Abey Kuruvilla
 Basil Thampi
 Jalaj Saxena
 Sachin Baby
 Tinu Yohannan

Football
 C. V. Pappachan
 Jo Paul Ancheri (C)
 Maymol Rocky
 Pappachen Pradeep
 Rino Anto 
 Thomas Varghese (Thiruvalla Pappan)
 Victor Manjila

Hockey
 Earnest Goodsir-Cullen
 Helen Mary
 Manuel Frederick

Volleyball
 Cyril C. Valloor (C)
 Jimmy George (C)
 Tom Joseph (C)

Squash
Sunayna Kuruvilla

Shooting
 Elizabeth Koshy

Swimming
 Sebastian Xavier

Olympians
 Thomas Varghese (Thiruvalla Pappan) ,Football (1948-London)
 Ivan Jacob, 400m (1952-Helenski)
 Manuel Frederick, Hockey (1972-Munich)
 T. C. Yohannan, Long Jump (1976-Montreal)
 Shiny Wilson, 800m (1984-Los Angeles, 1988-Seoul, 1992-Barcelona, 1996-Atlanta)
 Sebastian Xavier, Swimming (1996-Atlanta)
 Mercy Mathew Kuttan, 400m (1988-Seoul)
 Bobby Aloysius, High Jump (2004-Athens)
 Jincy Phillip, 4x400 relay (2000-Sydney)
 Anju Bobby George, Long Jump (2004-Athens, 2008-Beijing)
 Sini Jose, 4 × 400 m (2008-Beijing)
 Tintu Luka, 800 m (2012-London)
 Mayookha Johny, Triple jump (2012-London)
 Valiyaveetil Diju, Badminton (2012-London)
 Jinson Johnson, 800 m (2016 Rio de Janeiro)
 Jisna Mathew, 4 × 400 m (2016 Rio de Janeiro)

Gallery

References

Nasrani, Syrian Malabar
Indian Christians